The following outline is provided as an overview of and topical guide to Paris:

Since the 17th century, Paris has been one of Europe's major centres of finance, commerce, fashion, science, and the arts.

General reference 

 Pronunciation of "Paris"
 
  
 Common English name: Paris
 Official English name: City of Paris
 Adjectival: Parisian
 Demonym: Parisian

Geography of Paris 

 Paris is a city, and is both the Capital and primate city of France

Location of Paris 

Paris is situated within the following regions:
 Northern Hemisphere and Eastern Hemisphere
 Eurasia
 Europe (outline)
 Western Europe
 France (outline)
 Île-de-France
 Grande Couronne
 Petite Couronne

Landforms of Paris 

 Hills in Paris
 Belleville
 Butte-aux-Cailles
 Buttes-Chaumont
 Chaillot
 Menilmontant
 Montagne Sainte-Geneviève
 Montmartre
 Montparnasse
 Passy
 Islands of Paris
 On the Seine River
 Île de la Cité
 Île aux Cygnes
 Île Saint-Louis
 Waterways of Paris
 Canals in Paris
 Canal de l'Ourcq
 Canal Saint-Denis
 Canal Saint-Martin
 Rivers in Paris
Bièvre (river)
 Seine
La Rive Droite – The Right Bank
 La Rive Gauche – The Left Bank

Areas of Paris

Arrondissements of Paris 

 1st arrondissement of Paris (Louvre)
 2nd arrondissement of Paris (Bourse)
 3rd arrondissement of Paris (Temple)
 4th arrondissement of Paris (Hôtel-de-Ville)
 5th arrondissement of Paris (Panthéon)
 6th arrondissement of Paris (Luxembourg)
 7th arrondissement of Paris (Palais-Bourbon)
 8th arrondissement of Paris (Élysée)
 9th arrondissement of Paris (Opéra)
 10th arrondissement of Paris (Entrepôt)
 11th arrondissement of Paris (Popincourt)
 12th arrondissement of Paris (Reuilly)
 13th arrondissement of Paris (Gobelins)
 14th arrondissement of Paris (Observatoire)
 15th arrondissement of Paris (Vaugirard)
 16th arrondissement of Paris (Passy)
 17th arrondissement of Paris (Batignolles-Monceau)
 18th arrondissement of Paris (Butte-Montmartre)
 19th arrondissement of Paris (Buttes-Chaumont)
 20th arrondissement of Paris (Ménilmontant)

Locations in Paris 

 Landmarks in Paris
 Tourist attractions in Paris

Bridges in Paris 

Bridges in Paris

Châteaus and hôtels particuliers in Paris 

 Châteaus in Paris
 Château de Bagatelle
 Château de Bagnolet, Paris
 Château de Bercy
 Conciergerie
 Louvre Palace
 Luxembourg Palace
 Château de la Muette
 Palais de la cité
 Palais-Royal
 Hôtels particuliers in Paris

City gates and walls of Paris 

 City gates of Paris
 City walls of Paris

Fortifications of Paris 

 Barrière d’Enfer
 Bastille
 Fort de Bicêtre
 Fort de Bois-d'Arcy
 Batterie de Bouviers
 Fort de Champigny
 Fort de Châtillon (Paris)
 City gates of Paris
 City walls of Paris
 Fort de Cormeilles-en-Parisis
 Fort de Domont
 Fort d'Aubervilliers
 Fort d'Ivry
 Fort de Charenton
 Fort de l'Est
 Fort de Romainville
 Fort de Villiers
 Fortifications of Paris in the 19th and 20th centuries
 Grand Châtelet
 Fort d'Issy
 Fort Mont-Valérien
 Fort de Montmorency
 Fort de Nogent
 Porte d'Italie
 Porte Maillot
 Redoute de Gravelle
 Fort de Saint-Cyr
 Fort de Sucy
 Thiers wall
 Tour de Nesle
 Tour du coin (Louvre)
 Tour Jean-sans-Peur
 Fort du Trou-d'Enfer
 Fort de Vaujours
 Fort Neuf de Vincennes
 Wall of Charles V
 Wall of Philip II Augustus
 Wall of the Ferme générale

Fountains in Paris 

Fountains in Paris (list)

Libraries in Paris 

Libraries in Paris

Monuments and memorials in Paris 

 Arc de Triomphe
 Arc de Triomphe du Carrousel
 Théâtre de l'Atelier
 Théâtre des Bouffes du Nord
 Théâtre national de Chaillot
 La Cigale
 Elephant of the Bastille
 Flame of Liberty
 Headbutt (sculpture)
 Les Invalides
 July Column
 Luxor Obelisk
 Medici column
 Mémorial des Martyrs de la Déportation
 Théâtre Montparnasse
 Panthéon
 Place des Victoires
 Porte Saint-Denis
 Porte Saint-Martin
 Reines de France et Femmes illustres
 Saint-Jacques Tower

Museums and art galleries in Paris 

 Museums in Paris

Opera houses in Paris 

 List of theatres and entertainment venues in Paris
 Théâtre de la foire
 List of former or demolished entertainment venues in Paris
 Théâtre des Bouffes-Parisiens
 Théâtre du Châtelet
 Comédie-Italienne
 Théâtre Lyrique
 Opéra Bastille
 Opéra-Comique
 Opéra-National
 Palais Garnier
 Théâtre du Palais-Royal (rue Saint-Honoré)
 Théâtre de la Porte Saint-Martin
 Salle Le Peletier
 Théâtre des Tuileries
 Théâtre du Palais-Royal
 Théâtre Feydeau
 Théâtre Louvois
 Théâtre National de la rue de la Loi
 Salle Ventadour

Parks and gardens in Paris 

Parks and gardens in Paris

Public squares in Paris 

 Squares in Paris
 Haussmann's renovation of Paris
 Jean-Charles Adolphe Alphand
 Wallace fountain
 Place du 8 Février 1962
 Place du 8 Novembre 1942
 Place du 18 juin 1940
 Place d'Acadie
 Place de la Bastille
 Square des Batignolles
 Place Beauvau
 Place Blanche
 Place Cambronne
 Place du Carrousel
 Place Charles Michels
 Place Charles de Gaulle
 Place du Châtelet
 Place Clemenceau
 Place de Clichy
 Place Colette
 Place du Colonel Fabien
 Place du Commerce
 Place de la Concorde
 Place Dauphine
 Place Denfert-Rochereau
 Place Dupleix
 Place Emile Goudeau
 Place de l'Estrapade
 Place des États-Unis
 Place des Fêtes
 Place de Fontenoy
 Place de l'Hôtel-de-Ville – Esplanade de la Libération
 Place d'Italie
 Place Jussieu
 Place Louis Lépine
 Place du Louvre
 Place de la Madeleine
 Place Maillot
 Carré Marigny
 Place Maubert
 Place Monge
 Square Montholon
 Place de la Nation
 Place de l'Opéra
 Place du Palais-Royal
 Place du Panthéon
 Place du Parvis de Notre-Dame
 Parvis Notre-Dame – Place Jean-Paul-II
 Place Pigalle
 Place Pinel
 Place Dalida
 Place de la Bataille-de-Stalingrad
 Place du Palais-Bourbon
 Place Jean-Marais
 Place Joachim-du-Bellay
 Place des Pyramides
 Square René-Viviani
 Place de la République
 Rungis International Market
 Place Saint-Augustin
 Place Saint-Gervais
 Place Saint-Jacques
 Place Saint-Michel
 Place Saint-Paul
 Place Saint-Sulpice
 Square d'Orléans
 Place des Ternes
 Place du Tertre
 Place du Trocadéro
 Place Vendôme
 Place des Victoires
 Place des Vosges
 Place de Wagram

Religious buildings in Paris 

 Convents in Paris
 Abbaye-aux-Bois
 Cordeliers Convent
 Couvent des Célestins
 Couvent des Feuillants
 Madelonnettes Convent
 Christian monasteries in Paris
 Abbey of Saint-Germain-des-Prés
 Abbey of St Genevieve
 Couvent des Jacobins de la rue Saint-Honoré
 Couvent des Jacobins de la rue Saint-Jacques
 Montmartre Abbey
 Pentemont Abbey
 Port-Royal Abbey, Paris
 Saint-Antoine-des-Champs
 Saint-Martin-des-Champs Priory
 Val-de-Grâce

Streets in Paris 

 Avenues in Paris
 Avenue Charles-de-Gaulle (Neuilly-sur-Seine)
 Avenue d'Italie
 Avenue George V
 Avenue Hoche
 Champs-Élysées
 Avenue Foch
 Avenue Henri-Martin
 Avenue d'Iéna
 Avenue Kléber
 Avenue Montaigne
 Avenue de l'Opéra
 Avenue des Ternes
 Avenue Victor-Hugo (Paris)
 Avenue de Wagram
 Boulevards of Paris
 Boulevards of the Marshals
 Boulevard Auguste-Blanqui
 Boulevard Barbès
 Boulevard Beaumarchais
 Boulevard de l'Amiral-Bruix
 Boulevard des Capucines
 Boulevard de la Chapelle
 Boulevard de Clichy
 Boulevard du Crime
 Boulevard Haussmann
 Boulevard de l'Hôpital
 Boulevard des Italiens
 Boulevard de la Madeleine
 Boulevard de Magenta
 Boulevard Montmartre
 Boulevard du Montparnasse
 Boulevard Raspail
 Boulevard Richard-Lenoir
 Boulevard de Rochechouart
 Boulevard Saint-Germain
 Boulevard Saint-Michel
 Boulevard de Sébastopol
 Boulevard de Strasbourg
 Boulevard du Temple
 Boulevard Voltaire
 Boulevard de la Zone
 Quais in Paris
 Quai André-Citroën
 Port du Louvre
 Quai François Mitterrand
 Quai d'Orsay
 Quai des Célestins (Paris)
 Quai Louis-Blériot
 Quai Voltaire
 Quai des Tuileries

Theatres in Paris 

Theatres and entertainment venues in Paris

Towers in Paris 
 Eiffel Tower
 Eiffel Tower replicas and derivatives
 List of the 72 names on the Eiffel Tower

Triumphal arches in Paris 

 Arc de Triomphe
 Arc de Triomphe du Carrousel
 Porte Saint-Denis
 Porte Saint-Martin

Demographics of Paris 

Demographics of Paris

Government and politics of Paris 
 Council of Paris
 Mayors of Paris
 Twin towns and sister cities of Paris

History of Paris

History of Paris, by period or event 
 Paris in the Middle Ages
 Paris in the 16th century
 Paris in the 17th century
 Paris in the 18th century
 Paris in the 19th century
 Paris under Napoleon
 Paris during the Restoration
 Paris under Louis-Philippe
 Paris during the Second Empire
 Haussmann's renovation of Paris (1853-1870)
 Paris in the Belle Époque
 Paris in the 20th century
 Paris during the First World War
 Paris between the Wars (1919-1939)
 Paris in World War II
 History of Paris (1946-2000)

History of Paris, by subject 

 History of the architecture of Paris
 Battle of Paris
 City walls of Paris
 Former or demolished entertainment venues in Paris
 Expositions in Paris
 Exposition Internationale des Arts et Techniques dans la Vie Moderne
 Exposition Universelles held in Paris
 Exposition Universelle (1855)
 Exposition Universelle (1867)
 Exposition Universelle (1878)
 Exposition Universelle (1889)
 Exposition Universelle (1900)
 French Industrial Exposition of 1834
 French Industrial Exposition of 1844
 International Exhibition of Modern Decorative and Industrial Arts
 International Exhibition on Urbanism and Housing
 International Exposition of Electricity
 Exposition des produits de l'industrie française
 Fortifications of Paris in the 19th and 20th centuries
 Mayors of Paris
 History of music in Paris
 History of parks and gardens of Paris
 Historical population
 Siege of Paris (disambiguation), several sieges
 Writers in Paris

Culture of Paris 

 Symbols of Paris
 Coat of arms of Paris
 Flag of Paris

Arts in Paris

Architecture of Paris 

 Paris architecture of the Belle Époque
 Tallest building in Paris
 Tallest structures in Paris
 Tallest buildings and structures in the Paris region

Cinema of Paris 
 Films set in Paris

Music of Paris 

 Jazz clubs in Paris
 Songs about Paris

Theatre in Paris 

 Theatres and entertainment venues in Paris
 Former or demolished entertainment venues in Paris

People of Paris 

 People from Paris
 Honorary citizens of Paris
 University of Paris people

Religion in Paris 
 Roman Catholic Archdiocese of Paris

Sports in Paris 
 Football in Paris
 Running in Paris
 Paris Half Marathon
 Paris Marathon

Economy and infrastructure of Paris 

 Public services in Paris
 Paris Public Library
 Tourism in Paris
 Tourist attractions in Paris

Hotels in Paris 
 Beat Hotel
 Castille Paris
 Hôtel Costes
 Hôtel de Crillon
 Hôtel Barrière Le Fouquet's
 Four Seasons Hotel George V
 Hôtel Au Manoir Saint Germain des Prés
 Hôtel de Saint Fiacre
 Hotel des Trois Collèges
 Hotel La Louisiane
 Hôtel Raphael
 Hôtel Régina
 L'Hôtel
 Hyatt Regency Paris Étoile
 InterContinental Paris Le Grand Hotel
 Hôtel Le Bristol Paris
 Les Hôtels Baverez
 Hôtel Lutetia
 Maison Souquet
 Majestic Hôtel-Spa
 Mandarin Oriental, Paris
 Le Meurice
 Hotel Napoleon
 Palace (hotel)
 The Peninsula Paris
 Pershing Hall
 Piscine Molitor
 Plaza Athénée
 Hôtel Ritz Paris
 Sofitel Paris Le Faubourg
 The Westin Paris – Vendôme

Transportation in Paris 

 Rail transport in Paris
 Railway stations in Paris
 Paris subway
 Stations of the Paris Métro
 Stations of the Paris RER
 Road transport in Paris
 Cycling in Paris
 Bridges in Paris

Education in Paris 

 Secondary education in Paris
 Institutions of higher education in Paris
 Universities in Paris
 University of Paris

Health care in Paris 
 Hospitals in Paris
 Beaujon Hospital
 Hôpital de la Charité
 Hôpital Cochin
 Curie Institute (Paris)
 Hôpital des Enfants-Trouvés
 General Hospital of Paris
 Hôpital Européen Georges-Pompidou
 Hôtel-Dieu de Paris
 Lariboisière Hospital
 Necker-Enfants Malades Hospital
 Pitié-Salpêtrière Hospital
 Hôpital Saint-Louis
 Val-de-Grâce

Publications about Paris 

 Bibliography of Paris

See also 

 Outline of geography

Place these in body of outline 

 Boulevards of the Marshals
 Foreign cultural institutes in Paris
 List of Charvet customers
 Monuments historiques in Paris
 Town halls in Paris

External links 

Paris
Paris